Number 5 is the fifth studio album by American rock band Steve Miller Band. The album was released in 1970, by Capitol Records. It is the last of the group's albums to feature original drummer Tim Davis. The album reached number 23 on the Billboard 200 album chart.

Track listing

References

External links

1970 albums
Steve Miller Band albums
Capitol Records albums